The abortive transformation is a transformation of cells, which are unstable.  A few generations after transformation the cells revert to normal.
This process has been visualized in species such as Saccharomyces cerevisiae, where abortive transformants become formed during homologous recombination.

See also
 Malignant transformation

References

Cells